Parityakta is a Nepali language novel by Bhuwan Dhungana. It was published on June 28, 2020 by Nepa~laya Publication. It was nominated for Madan Puraskar for the year 2076 BS, one of the most prestigious literary award in Nepal.

Synopsis 
The book shows the inner thoughts of a woman in a patriarchal Nepali society and how she deals with loneliness. It is written in first person stream of consciousness narrative.

Release 
It is the first novel of the writer who has been active in the Nepali literary scene since 1970. The release of the book was delayed due to the COVID-19 lockdown. The book was launched as a part of 2020 series of Nepalaya publication which featured books of four women writers. The other books are Singha Durbarko Ghumne Mech by Dr. Sudha Sharma, Kumari Prashnaharu by Durga Karki and Dumero by Sarala Gautam.

Reception 
The book was nominated for Madan Puraskar for the year 2076 BS.

See also 

 Shirishko Phool
 Singha Durbarko Ghumne Mech
 Jiwan Kada Ki Phool
 Maharani

References

External links 
 Official Publisher's page
 Goodreads page

Nepalese novels
21st-century Nepalese books
Nepalese books

Cultural depictions of Nepalese women
2020 Nepalese novels
Novels set in Nepal
Nepali-language novels